Jansen's metaphyseal chondrodysplasia (JMC) is a disease that results from ligand-independent activation of the type 1 (PTH1R) of the parathyroid hormone receptor, due to one of three reported mutations (activating mutation).

JMC is extremely rare, and as of 2007 there are fewer than 20 reported cases worldwide.
There are only 2 known families, from Dubai and Texas, in which the disease was passed from mother to daughter (Texas), and from a mother to her 2 sons (Dubai).

Presentation
Blood levels of parathyroid hormone (PTH) are undetectable, but the mutation in the PTH1R leads to auto-activation of the signaling as though the hormone PTH is present. Severe JMC produces a dwarfing phenotype, or short stature. Examination of the bone reveals normal epiphyseal plates but disorganized metaphyseal regions. Hypercalcemia (elevated levels of calcium in the blood) and hypophosphatemia (reduced blood levels of phosphate), and elevated urinary calcium and phosphate, are generally found in JMC. The absence of hypercalcemia does not eliminate the disease from consideration.

Physical irregularities often associated with Jansen's include: prominent or protruding eyes, a high-arched palate, micrognathia or abnormal smallness of the jaws – particularly the lower (mandible) jaw, choanal stenosis, wide cranial sutures and irregular formation of the long bones which can resemble rickets. Nephrocalcinosis (accumulation of calcium in the renal interstitium) is seen commonly as well.

Cause
Jansen's metaphyseal chondrodysplasia is caused by a mutation in the PTH1R gene. Most cases are due to a spontaneous mutation. Inheritance is autosomal dominant.

Diagnosis
Diagnosis typically occurs during infancy or early childhood and is based around physical characteristics and symptoms. X-rays may reveal abnormal development of the bulbous ends of the metaphyses of the limb bones. Tests that detect hypercalciuria and hypercalcaemia are also helpful in the diagnosis.

Treatment
There is no known treatment at present, although some investigators have tried to lessen the hypercalcemia with various forms of bisphosphonates.

Eponym
It is named for Murk Jansen (1867–1935), a Dutch orthopedic surgeon.

References

Further reading
 Metaphyseal chondrodysplasia, Jansen type -- OrphaNet Information (PDF) 
 Jansen’s Metaphyseal Chondrodysplasia, Case Report, Indian Pediatrics
 Jansen Type Metaphyseal Chondrodysplasia -- National Organization for Rare Disorders (NORD)
 A Novel Parathyroid Hormone (PTH)/PTH-Related Peptide Receptor Mutation in Jansen’s Metaphyseal Chondrodysplasia, The Journal of Clinical Endocrinology & Metabolism (1) 
 A Form of Jansen’s Metaphyseal Chondrodysplasia with Limited Metabolic and Skeletal Abnormalities Is Caused by a Novel Activating Parathyroid Hormone (PTH)/PTH-Related Peptide Receptor Mutation, The Journal of Clinical Endocrinology & Metabolism (2) 
 Constitutively Activated Receptors for Parathyroid Hormone and Parathyroid Hormone–Related Peptide in Jansen's Metaphyseal Chondrodysplasia, The New England Journal of Medicine
 Constitutive Activation of the Cyclic Adenosine 3',5'-Monophosphate Signaling Pathway by Parathyroid Hormone (PTH)/PTH-Related Peptide Receptors Mutated at the Two Loci for Jansen’s Metaphyseal Chondrodysplasia, Molecular Endocrinology

External links 

Syndromes
Growth disorders
Cell surface receptor deficiencies
Rare diseases